Aenictus spathifer is a species of brown army ant found in Indonesia.

References

Dorylinae
Hymenoptera of Asia
Insects described in 1928